Double Edge Theatre, an artist-run organization, was founded in 1982 by Stacy Klein. The company applies vigorous physical training and the principle of an artist's autonomy to create work in an ensemble setting intimately woven with the community. Double Edge's name in part comes from the double-edged axe known as the labrys, which was used in Bacchic sacrifices in ancient Greek cult-worship. Double Edge's first production, Rites, was based on Euripides's The Bacchae.

The Double Edge ensemble creates performance cycles that tour internationally, including the Women's Cycle, the Song Trilogy, and the Garden of Intimacy and Desire. 

The Chagall Cycle, which includes The Odyssey, Shahrazad, and The Grand Parade, responds to the life, work and indomitable imagination of Russian-Jewish artist Marc Chagall, while engaging with international collaborators in music, design and dramaturgy. 

The Latin American Cycle (2015–present) is inspired by the magical realist literature and surrealist visual art and literature of South America, particularly that of Leonora Carrington and Alejandro Jodorowsky, and includes the performances Once a Blue Moon (Cada Luna Azul), The Latin American Spectacle, and Leonora and Alejandro: La Maga y el Maestro. 

The 2018 Summer Spectacle is We The People, a traveling performance which intersects art, culture, and democracy and has its roots in Double Edge's thirty-six year question of what makes up identity- what are the hidden territories of the land, of history, of imagination, and how do they speak to us as citizens in the present moment?

In 1994, Double Edge moved from Boston to a 105-acre former dairy farm in rural Ashfield, MA, to create a sustainable artistic home. Today, the Farm is an International Centre of Living Culture, a base for the ensemble's extensive international touring, with year-round theatre training, conversations and convenings, greening and farming initiatives, and a popular indoor/outdoor traveling spectacle which takes place alongside the hills, pastures, river, and gardens of the Centre.

Double Edge Productions 
Indoor Performances

 SUGA (2019)
 Leonora and Alejandro: La Maga y el Maestro (2018–present)
 Cada Luna Azul (Once a Blue Moon) (2015–present)
 The Latin American Spectacle (2015–present)
 The Grand Parade (2013)
 The Disappearance (2008-2010)
 Republic of Dreams (2007)
 The Unpossessed (2005)
 Relentless (2001)
 Keter, The Crowning Song (1997)
 Song of Songs (1993)
 Song of Absence (1988)
 Request Concert (1986)
 Had She Spoken (1985)
 Bold Stroke for a Wife (1985)
 The Hunger Artist (1984)
 My Sister in this House (1983)
 Blood Rubies (1982)
 Rites (1982)

Summer Spectacles

 I am the Baron (2019)
 Leonora’s World (2018)
 We The People (2017)
 Ashfield Town Spectacle and Culture Fair (2017)
 Latin American Spectacle (2016)
 Once a Blue Moon - Cada Luna Azul (2015)
 Shahrazad, A Tale of Love and Magic (2013)
 The Odyssey (2011)
 Firebird (2010)
 The Arabian Nights (2009)
 The Illustrious Return of Don Quixote (2008)
 The Magician of Avalon (2007)
 The Three Musketeers (2006)
 Master and Margarita (2004)
 Don Quixote (2003)
 The Saragossa Manuscripts (2002)

Distinctions

2012 - A documentary on Double Edge Theatre entitled Theatre on the Edge was awarded a regional Emmy.
2010 - Double Edge Theatre was included in the United Nations General Assembly's "2010 Year for the Rapprochement of Cultures."

Training 
Training is the heart and vitality of Double Edge's creative process. Since 1982, when it was first developed by Klein based on her work with Rena Mirecka, Grotowski’s founding actor, DE training has grown to include work with large objects, developed by Klein and David Flaxman from 1985, and then outdoor work and spectacle developed with Carlos Uriona since 1996. Since 2011 Matthew Glassman has led the ensemble's training development. Vocal training is led by John Peitso, with Amanda Miller. The unique, holistic methodology engages the actor's full potential – physical, vocal, emotional, and imaginative – to drive individual exploration, ensemble collaboration, and performance creation.

Double Edge Theatre offers Training Immersion and Intensive programs on-site at the Farm, as well as workshops in residence and on tour. This program is led by Jeremy Louise Eaton, Director of Student Programs. These residencies and training workshops are held at universities, and in conjunction with performances, at high schools, in other theatres, and community venues.

Training programs and workshops contain the following elements:

Physical training; involving a total body experience including running, partner work, and work with large objects. Although vigorous, the process allows any participant to fully engage.

Improvisation; which is a combination of individual creation and group work. Improvisation allows participants to build a world of the imagination, and includes work with large objects, music, art, video, and other elements.

Etudes and Presentations; created from the improvisation and individual work; scenes are created and built using music, art, video, dance, and character to create a unified piece. The goal is to translate training into devised work process.

Facilities and Farm 
The Double Edge Theatre Farm Centre is sited on a 105-acre former dairy farm in Ashfield, MA. The facility includes two performance and training spaces, production facilities, offices, archives, music room, and outdoor performance areas as well as hay fields, grazing pastures, a stream, pond, and forestland. There is also an animal barn, vegetable gardens and a high tunnel hoop house, and an additional property in the town centre housing resident and emerging artists and DE's Emerging Artists Studio. Another property has been transformed into a design house, with design offices, studios, costume shop, and set, costume, and prop storage. On the Farm, the company trains, performs, runs the business of the theatre, hosts programs and guests, and grows food. A vision of future facilities includes a public archive/gallery, a meeting house space, and a fully developed farm.

The preservation of the historic integrity of the buildings on the Farm has guided the process of renovation since the Double Edge ensemble moved to Ashfield, as has the shrinking of the theatre's energy footprint. At the heart of all facilities planning is the development of long-term stability and an increased capacity to accommodate creative programming and food production.

External links
Double Edge Theatre Official Website
7 Captivating Live Theatre Experiences
WOMEN and the UNKNOWN: presented by Stacy Klein at Anger / Appetite / Ambition / ART — a Symposium on Women Innovators in the Arts: Montclair State University, March 28, 2018.
Review: ‘Leonora and Alejandro’ and One Rather Trippy Encounter by Elisabeth Vincentelli, The New York Times March 19, 2018
‘We The People”: Double Edge’s summer performance will ask the audience to think about how the phrase applies to each of them by Richie Davis, The Greenfield Recorder July 12, 2017
A South American goes home, and brings the audience with him by Terry Byrne, Boston Globe July 21, 2016
World Class Theatre in Ashfield, MA by Jesse Seaver, The Huffington Post August 26, 2015
A Conversation between Stacy Klein of Double Edge Theatre and Jennifer Johnson of The Charlestown Working Theatre HowIRound
Fuse Theatre Review: "The Grand Parade" - History as an Imaginative Pageant by Terry Byrne, The Arts Fuse May 3, 2015
 Double Edge Theatre on American Theatre Wing's documentary series "Working in the Theatre'

Theatre companies in Massachusetts
Physical theatre